MTV Unplugged is the debut live album and overall the second album by the Pakistani indie rock band, Aunty Disco Project, released in June 2009. It is exclusively a digital download live album, and has not been released on a physical medium. The album included recordings from the band's live performances on MTV Pakistan.

Track listing
All music written, composed & arranged by Aunty Disco Project. "Friends" was originally recorded by Led Zeppelin and "Rock the Casbah" was originally recorded by The Clash.

Personnel
All information is taken from the CD.

Aunty Disco Project
Omar Bilal Akhtar - vocals, lead guitar
Giles Goveas - drums
Ali Alam - vocals, rhythm guitar
Rahail Siddiqui - bass, backing vocals

Production
Produced by Aunty Disco Project
Recorded & Mixed at MTV Pakistan Studios in Karachi, Pakistan

References

External links
Official website
Official blog
Aunty Disco Project at YouTube

2009 live albums
Aunty Disco Project albums
Urdu-language albums